Sameteli can refer to:

 Sameteli, Çan
 Sameteli, Yenice